Mun Ji-hee (born August 2, 1988) is a South Korean biathlete.

Mun competed in the 2010 Winter Olympics for South Korea. Her best performance was 63rd in the sprint. She also finished 73rd in the individual.

As of February 2013, her best performance at the Biathlon World Championships is 17th, as part of the 2009 South Korean women's relay team. Her best individual performance is 65th, in the 2009 sprint.

As of February 2013, Mun's best performance in a Biathlon World Cup event is 14th, as part of the mixed relay team and the women's relay team. Her best individual result is 37th, in the sprint at Pyeongchang in 2007/08. Her best overall finish in the Biathlon World Cup is 101st, in 2009/10.

References 

1988 births
Biathletes at the 2010 Winter Olympics
Biathletes at the 2014 Winter Olympics
Biathletes at the 2018 Winter Olympics
South Korean female biathletes
Living people
Olympic biathletes of South Korea
Sportspeople from North Jeolla Province
Biathletes at the 2007 Asian Winter Games
Biathletes at the 2011 Asian Winter Games
Biathletes at the 2017 Asian Winter Games
20th-century South Korean women
21st-century South Korean women